Leptolyngbya is a genus of cyanobacteria belonging to the family Leptolyngbyaceae.

The genus has cosmopolitan distribution.

Species

Species:

Leptolyngbya angusta 
Leptolyngbya angustissima 
Leptolyngbya benthonica

References

Synechococcales
Cyanobacteria genera